"All Things (Just Keep Getting Better)" is a song composed by Canadian electronic music production team Widelife with Simone Denny of Love Inc. on vocals. It was the theme song for the television series Queer Eye for the Straight Guy and was an official song of the 2021 CONCACAF Gold Cup

Release 
Released as the lead single for the Queer Eye soundtrack, the song peaked at number five on the US Billboard Dance Club Play chart and number 12 in Australia, where it was the 13th-most-successful dance hit of 2004.

Widelife performed this single on The Tonight Show with Jay Leno. The song was officially remixed by HQ2 (Hex Hector & Mac Quayle), Barry Harris, and Jason Nevins, and appeared in an episode of South Park, titled "South Park Is Gay!".

Accolades 
In 2005, Widelife won the Juno Award for Dance Recording of the Year for the single "All Things."

Track listings 
Australasian CD single
 "All Things (Just Keep Getting Better)" (original version) – 2:45
 "All Things (Just Keep Getting Better)" (H2Q club mix) – 7:32
 "All Things (Just Keep Getting Better)" (Jason Nevins Big Room remix) – 9:30
 "All Things (Just Keep Getting Better)" (Jason Nevins Hands Up mix) – 6:42
 "All Things (Just Keep Getting Better)" (Barry Harris Club Interpretation mix) – 9:28

Credits and personnel 
Credits are taken from the US promo CD liner notes.

Studio
 Mixed at Townhouse Studios (London, England)

Personnel
 Ian J Nieman, Rachid Wehbi – writing, production
 Widelife – recording
 Jeremy Wheatley – additional production, mixing
 Giulio Pierucci – additional programming
 Rob Eric – executive production

Charts

Weekly charts

Year-end charts

Release history

Betty Who version 
In 2018, a remixed version by Betty Who was released as the theme song for season two of the Netflix reboot, Queer Eye; however, it was never actually used in any episodes. A music video was released featuring the cast of Queer Eye, Jonathan Van Ness, Karamo Brown, Antoni Porowski, Bobby Berk, and Tan France.

References 

2003 singles
2003 songs
2021 CONCACAF Gold Cup
Betty Who songs
Capitol Records singles
CONCACAF Gold Cup official songs and anthems
Juno Award for Single of the Year singles
LGBT-related songs